Hans-Henrik Krause (13 March 1918 – 15 April 2002) was a Danish actor and film director. He appeared in 29 films between 1942 and 1992. He was born in Hellerup, Denmark.

Filmography

 Planetens spejle (1992)
 Mord i Paradis (1988)
 Peter von Scholten (1987)
 Snart dages det brødre (1974)
 I Adams verden (1973)
 Fru Geesches frihed (1973)
 Man sku være noget ved musikken (1972)
 Sejle op ad åen (1972)
 Laila Løvehjerte (1972)
 Den forsvundne fuldmægtig (1971)
 Hyp lille Lotte (1970)
 Dimensionspigen (1970)
 Værelset (1970)
 Præriens skrappe drenge (1970)
 Pigen fra Egborg (1969)
 Smukke-Arne og Rosa (1967)
 Historien om Barbara (1967)
 I stykker (1966)
 Sorte Shara (1961)
 Himlen er blaa (1954)
 Sønnen (1953)
 Nålen (1951)
 Tre år efter (1948)
 Ditte menneskebarn (1946)
 I gaar og i morgen (1945)
 Otte akkorder (1944)
 Elly Petersen (1944)
 Det kære København (1944)
 Damen med de lyse Handsker (1942)

External links

1918 births
2002 deaths
Danish male film actors
Danish film directors
People from Gentofte Municipality
20th-century Danish male actors